Lake Poyrazlar Nature Park is a nature park declared lake in Sakarya Province, northwestern Turkey.

The lake and its surroundings was declared a first-grade natural protected area in 1993 by the Council for the Protection of Cultural and Natural Heritage. In 1995, a development plan for the area was worked out, and it was officially registered. The area was leased for a lease term of five years in 2009. The area on the west bank of Lake Poyrazlar was declared a nature park in 2011 by the Ministry of Forest and Water Management.

The lake is a habitat for 153 bird species, of which 64 are resident, 36 live in winter and 47 in summer, and six stop by as migrating birds. A wide variety of butterflies can be observed during early May. Freshwater fish as food is also popular at the site.

Among other outdoor sport activities, paddling and all-terrain vehicle riding are offered in the nature park.

References

Poyrazlar
Nature parks in Turkey
Landforms of Sakarya Province
Protected areas established in 2011
2011 establishments in Turkey